Patrick Berg (born 24 November 1997) is a Norwegian professional footballer who plays as a defensive midfielder for Eliteserien club Bodø/Glimt.

Club career

Bodø/Glimt
Berg was born in Bodø. He made his senior debut for Bodø/Glimt on 12 July 2014 in a 3–0 loss to Odd.

Lens
On 20 December 2021, Berg signed for Ligue 1 side Lens on a contract until 2026. The transfer fee paid to Bodø/Glimt was reportedly of €4.5 million.

Return to Bodø/Glimt
On 29 August 2022, Berg returned to Bodø/Glimt and signed a five-year contract.

International career
On 24 March 2021, Berg made his international debut for the Norway national team, in a World Cup qualifier against Gibraltar, making him Norway's first ever third-generation international footballer.

Personal life
Berg comes from a football family; his father Ørjan Berg, his grandfather Harald Berg, his uncles Arild and Runar Berg, and his great uncle Knut Berg have all played for Bodø/Glimt. Harald, Ørjan and Runar have also played for the national team.

Career statistics

Club

International

Honours
Bodø/Glimt
Eliteserien: 2020, 2021

Individual
Eliteserien Player of the Year: 2021

References

1997 births
Living people
Sportspeople from Bodø
Norwegian footballers
Association football midfielders
Norway international footballers
Norway youth international footballers
Eliteserien players
Norwegian First Division players
Ligue 1 players
FK Bodø/Glimt players
RC Lens players
Berg family
Norwegian expatriate footballers
Norwegian expatriate sportspeople in France
Expatriate footballers in France